El Manzala is a region (markaz) in Egypt. Situated in the Dakahlia Governorate, it lies on the Lake Manzala coast in the northeastern part of the country.

Etymology 
In Middle Ages it was also known as pi-Manjōili, translated into Greek as Xenedokhou, thus making the modern Arabic name a translation of a Coptic one, where phonetic resemblance is only coincidental.

Projects
In 2018 money was earmarked by the Egyptian Government for infrastructure projects in El Manzala.

Divisions

El Manzala comprises villages such as:

Arab Zidan
Awlad Alam
Awlad Bana
Awlad Hana
Awlad Nasser
Awlad Nour
Awlad Serag
Awlad Soboor
Bani Hilal
El Ahmadiya
El Amarna
El Aziza
El Basaila
El Bosrat
El Dakanwa
El Dakanwa El Gedida
El Forasat
El Gideeda
El Hawata
El Nasaima
El Orban
El Qazaqiza
El Sherifiya
El Shibool
El Sataita
El Tawabra
Ezbet El Belasi

See also
 List of cities and towns in Egypt

References

External links
 Ask Aladdin Manzala Travel Guide

Populated places in Dakahlia Governorate